Cannabis in Sierra Leone is illegal, but is widely cultivated and consumed in the country, and exported to neighboring countries and to Europe. Cannabis is known locally as diamba.

History
Cannabis is believed to have become commonly cultivated in Sierra Leone well before it became widespread in West Africa. Midwives used it as anaesthesia for childbirth, and fishermen used it to deal with their difficult labors. An 1851 journal article reported that cannabis had been "long in use" in the interior of Sierra Leone, and claimed that cannabis seeds were brought to the colony by "Congoes captured by one of our cruisers." Sierra Leonean sailors and stevedores played a role in disseminating cannabis regionally, spreading the use of the drug to Ghana and Gambia.

Cannabis was first banned in Sierra Leone in 1920, during the country's British colonial period; cannabis was included in that year as an addendum to the nation's 1913 Opium Act.

Cultivation
The 2011 International Narcotics Control Strategy Report noted that cannabis is widely cultivated in Sierra Leone, to the degree that the national government was concerned that cannabis may be crowding out subsistence farming and threatening food security.

Popularity
A doctor stated to Sierra Leone's Truth and Reconciliation Committee in 2003: "Cannabis sativa is so commonly used or abused in Sierra Leone... that I don't think people consider it a crime any more to use it... As you can see, it is grown nearly everywhere in Sierra Leone today. You can get it anytime, anywhere, either for free or for a low fee."

References

Further reading

Sierra Leone
Drugs in Sierra Leone